Poland participated in the Eurovision Song Contest 2006 with the song "Follow My Heart" written by André Franke, Michał Wiśniewski, Jacek Łągwa and Real McCoy. The song was performed by the band Ich Troje featuring Real McCoy. The Polish broadcaster Telewizja Polska (TVP) organised the national final Piosenka dla Europy 2006 in order to select the Polish entry for the 2006 contest in Athens, Greece. The national final took place on 28 February 2006 and featured fifteen entries. "Follow My Heart" performed by Ich Troje featuring Real McCoy was selected as the winner after gaining the most points following the combination of votes from a six-member jury panel and a public vote.

Poland competed in the semi-final of the Eurovision Song Contest which took place on 18 May 2006. Performing in position 12, "Follow My Heart" was not announced among the top 10 entries of the semi-final and therefore did not qualify to compete in the final. It was later revealed that Poland placed eleventh out of the 23 participating countries in the semi-final with 70 points.

Background 

Prior to the 2006 Contest, Poland had participated in the Eurovision Song Contest ten times since its first entry in 1994. Poland's highest placement in the contest, to this point, has been second place, which the nation achieved with its debut entry in 1994 with the song "To nie ja!" performed by Edyta Górniak. Poland has only, thus far, reached the top ten on one other occasion, when Ich Troje performing the song "Keine Grenzen – Żadnych granic" finished seventh in 2003. In 2005, Poland failed to qualify from the semi-final round with their entry "Czarna dziewczyna" performed by Ivan and Delfin.

The Polish national broadcaster, Telewizja Polska (TVP), broadcasts the event within Poland and organises the selection process for the nation's entry. TVP confirmed Poland's participation in the 2006 Eurovision Song Contest on 11 November 2005. In 2003 and 2004, TVP organised televised national finals that featured a competition among several artists and songs in order to select the Polish entry for the Eurovision Song Contest. The broadcaster opted to internally select the 2005 entry, however, along with their participation confirmation, TVP announced that the Polish entry for the 2006 Eurovision Song Contest would be selected via a national final.

Before Eurovision

Piosenka dla Europy 2006 
Piosenka dla Europy 2006 was the national final organised by TVP in order to select the Polish entry for the Eurovision Song Contest 2006. The show took place on 28 January 2006 at the Studio 5 of TVP in Warsaw, hosted by Artur Orzech and Agnieszka Szulim. A combination of public televoting and jury voting selected the winner. The show was broadcast on TVP1 and TVP Polonia as well as streamed online at the broadcaster's website tvp.pl. The national final was watched by over 5 million viewers in Poland with a market share of 36%.

Competing entries 
TVP opened a submission period for interested artists and songwriters to submit their entries between 11 November 2005 and 10 December 2005. The broadcaster received 112 submissions at the closing of the deadline, including entries from Anabel Conde, which represented Spain in the Eurovision Song Contest in 1995, Ich Troje, which represented Poland in the Eurovision Song Contest in 2003, and Ivan and Delfin, both of them which represented Poland in the Eurovision Song Contest in 2005. An eleven-member selection committee selected fifteen entries from the received submissions to compete in the national final. Among the members of the selection committee included Bogdan Olewicz (composer), Zygmunt Kukla (conductor, composer), Robert Sankowski (journalist), Janusz Kosiński (journalist) and Piotr Klatt (musician, songwriter, journalist and music producer at TVP and artistic director of the Opole Festival). The selected entries were announced on 20 December 2006. Among the competing artists was the band Ich Troje, which represented Poland in the Eurovision Song Contest in 2003.

Final 
The televised final took place on 28 January 2006. Fifteen entries competed and the winner, "Follow My Heart" performed by Ich Troje featuring Real McCoy, was determined by a 50/50 combination of votes from a six-member professional jury and a public vote. The jury consisted of Maryla Rodowicz (singer), Maria Szabłowska (music journalist at TVP and Polish Radio), Elżbieta Skrętkowska (creator of Szansa na Sukces), Beata Drążkowska (member of OGAE Poland), Zygmunt Kukla (conductor, composer) and Robert Leszczyński (journalist). Ich Troje featuring Real McCoy and Katarzyna Cerekwicka were both tied for the first place with 17 points, however the results of the public vote took precedence and led to the victory of Ich Troje featuring Real McCoy. In addition to the performances of the competing entries, the band Bajm and 2004 Polish Eurovision entrants Blue Café performed as the interval acts.

At Eurovision 
According to Eurovision rules, all nations with the exceptions of the host country, the "Big Four" (France, Germany, Spain and the United Kingdom) and the ten highest placed finishers in the 2005 contest are required to qualify from the semi-final on 18 May 2006 in order to compete for the final on 20 May 2006; the top ten countries from the semi-final progress to the final. On 21 March 2006, a special allocation draw was held which determined the running order for the semi-final and Poland was set to perform in position 12, following the entry from Macedonia and before the entry from Russia.

The semi-final and the final were broadcast in Poland on TVP1 and TVP Polonia with commentary by Artur Orzech. The Polish spokesperson, who announced the Polish votes during the final, was Maciej Orłoś.

Semi-final 
Ich Troje and Real McCoy took part in technical rehearsals on 11 and 13 May, followed by dress rehearsals on 17 and 18 May. The Polish performance featured the members of Ich Troje performing in white, gold and beige ornate costumes and joined by two backing vocalists, while Real McCoy performed off stage amongst the audience. Male vocalist of Ich Troje, Michał Wiśniewski, had green and white hair rather than his usual red due to his promotional contract with a mobile network operator. Wiśniewski concluded the performance by tearing off the dress of pregnant vocalist and his then-fiancée Anna Świątczak and displayed affection towards their unborn baby. The stage was predominately in blue and red colours with gold stars displaying on the background. The performance also featured pyrotechnic effects.

At the end of the show, Poland was not announced among the top 10 entries in the semi-final and therefore failed to qualify to compete in the final. It was later revealed that Poland placed eleventh in the semi-final, receiving a total of 70 points.

Voting 
Below is a breakdown of points awarded to Poland and awarded by Poland in the semi-final and grand final of the contest. The nation awarded its 12 points to Finland in the semi-final and the final of the contest.

Points awarded to Poland

Points awarded by Poland

References

2006
Countries in the Eurovision Song Contest 2006
Eurovision
Eurovision